There are several settlements on Norfolk Island; they are all either towns or hamlets. There are no cities on Norfolk Island.

Kingston  (official capital)
Anson Bay
Bumboras
Burnt Pine (largest town, with airport nearby)
Cascade
Longridge
Middlegate
Rocky Point
Steeles Point

Norfolk Island-related lists